Abrasimov (masculine) or Abrasimova (feminine) is a Russian last name, a variant of Abrosimov. The following people bear this last name:
Pyotr Abrasimov, Soviet Ambassador to the People's Republic of Poland in 1957–1961 and to the Republic of France in 1971–1973

References

Notes

Sources
И. М. Ганжина (I. M. Ganzhina). "Словарь современных русских фамилий" (Dictionary of Modern Russian Last Names). Москва, 2001. 

Russian-language surnames
